Nitrium may refer to:

 Nitrium, a variant of natrium, the original name for the chemical element sodium
 Nitrium, another name for a potash compound
 A material mentioned in the Star Trek: The Next Generation episode "Cost of Living"
 Nitrium, the name of a Hot Wheels model